Dusan J. "Duke" Maronic (July 13, 1921 – July 1, 1996)  was an American football offensive lineman who played eight seasons in the NFL, mainly for the Philadelphia Eagles.  He didn't play college football. In 1965, Maronic was also an assistant coach in the Atlantic Coast Football League with the Harrisburg Capitols, and then took over the head coaching job in 1966 through 1967.

References

External links

1921 births
1996 deaths
People from Dauphin County, Pennsylvania
Philadelphia Eagles players
New York Giants players
American football offensive linemen
Players of American football from Pennsylvania
American people of Serbian descent